Morris Elmer Lister (July 21, 1881 – March 27, 1947) was a Major League Baseball first baseman who played in 22 games for the Cleveland Naps during the 1907 season.

External links

1881 births
1947 deaths
Cleveland Naps players
Major League Baseball first basemen
Baseball players from Illinois
Minor league baseball managers
Le Mars Blackbirds players
Rock Island Islanders players
Portland Beavers players
Birmingham Barons players
Nashville Vols players
Toledo Mud Hens players
Williamsport Millionaires players
Atlanta Crackers players
Chattanooga Lookouts players
Charlotte Hornets (baseball) players
Davenport Prodigals players
Bloomington Bloomers players
Peoria Distillers players
People from Savanna, Illinois